"Felicità" (Italian for "Happiness") is a song by Italian-American duo Al Bano and Romina Power, released in 1982. It was an international commercial success and remains arguably their best-known song.

Song information
The duo participated with the track in the 1982 Sanremo Music Festival and finished second. The song appeared on their 1982 album Felicità (also known as Aria pura). The closing track from the album, "Arrivederci a Bahia", was released as the B side. For the Spanish release, both songs were re-recorded in Spanish, and the single received a different cover image.

"Felicità" was met with a great commercial success, topping Italian singles chart and eventually selling in millions of copies internationally in March–June 1982.

The song was performed by Laislavo 'Lado' Kravanja and Léa Seydoux at the end of the 2009 film Lourdes.

Music video
The music video for the song was filmed in Leningrad, on the banks of Neva River. It pictures Albano Carrisi and Romina Power performing the song while driving a motorboat and sitting in a carriage. Romina and most extras wear historic costumes.

Track listing and formats 

 Italian 7-inch single

A. "Felicità" – 3:13
B. "Arrivederci a Bahia" – 3:02

Charts

Certifications

References 

1982 songs
1982 singles
Al Bano and Romina Power songs
Male–female vocal duets
Number-one singles in Italy
Sanremo Music Festival songs
Songs written by Dario Farina
Songs written by Cristiano Minellono